Juan Merino Ruiz (born 24 August 1970) is a Spanish retired footballer who played mainly as a central defender, currently a manager.

He played solely in Andalusia in a 17-year professional career, with Betis and Recreativo, appearing in more than 200 matches in both La Liga and the Segunda División.

Subsequently, Merino worked as a manager, including jobs at his former clubs.

Playing career
Born in La Línea de la Concepción, Province of Cádiz, Merino joined Real Betis's first team in 1990, becoming their captain in later years. Out of his 12 years at the club eight were in La Liga, and he appeared in 203 games in that division, scoring two goals; in the 1996–97 season, he contributed 36 matches to help to a fourth-place finish.

In 2002–03, staying in Andalusia, Merino signed a two-year contract with Recreativo de Huelva. In his first season the side was relegated, regaining top-flight status in 2006 as champions. After featuring in 23 games in the 2006–07 campaign he retired from football, with 522 professional appearances to his credit.

Coaching career
Immediately after retiring, Merino rejoined Betis as director of football. He was named assistant coach in 2009, going on to work with two different managers.

In the 2010–11 season, Merino cut ties with Betis and returned to Recre as assistant to Pablo Alfaro – a former Sevilla FC defender – with the club in the Segunda División. The latter was fired in mid-October after only eight games (four draws and four losses), and the former stayed on as second in command to Carlos Ríos.

Merino was named manager of Xerez CD on 14 June 2011. He was sacked on 4 December, due to poor results.

On 25 June 2014, after nearly three years without a club, Merino was appointed at the helm of Betis B. On 25 November, after Julio Velázquez's dismissal from the first team, he was named interim manager; he remained in charge for four league matches, achieving as many wins before being replaced by Pepe Mel and returning to his previous duties.

On 11 January 2016, Merino was again appointed caretaker manager at Betis, following Mel's sacking. On 3 February, he was chosen to remain in the position until the end of the season.

On 25 May 2016, after the arrival of new boss Gus Poyet, Merino left Betis. On 28 December, he took over at second-tier club Gimnàstic de Tarragona in the place of Vicente Moreno, but was himself relieved of his duties the following 20 May as the team was still in the relegation zone.

On 18 October 2017, Merino replaced the dismissed Luis Carrión at the helm of Córdoba CF, still in the second division. He was fired on 7 December after winning none and drawing three of his seven fixtures.

Merino returned to management on 29 April 2019, taking over from Pedro Munitis at UCAM Murcia CF and tasked with taking the team to play-offs of Segunda División B in their final three games.

Managerial statistics

Honours
Recreativo
Segunda División: 2005–06

References

External links

Beticopedia profile 

1970 births
Living people
Spanish footballers
Footballers from La Línea de la Concepción
Association football defenders
Association football utility players
La Liga players
Segunda División players
Segunda División B players
Betis Deportivo Balompié footballers
Real Betis players
Recreativo de Huelva players
Spain under-21 international footballers
Spain under-23 international footballers
Spanish football managers
La Liga managers
Segunda División managers
Segunda División B managers
Xerez CD managers
Real Betis managers
Gimnàstic de Tarragona managers
Córdoba CF managers
UCAM Murcia CF managers